Patxi is a male given name in the Basque language area in northern Spain and south-west France, but more commonly a nickname for those officially named Francisco (or François in the French zone, ultimately cognates of Francis); the original Basque equivalent was Frantzisko, but this was rarely chosen as a forename by parents in the modern era, and along with Patxi it was forbidden to be given to babies under the language policies of Francoist Spain between the 1940s and 1970s, hence the widespread unofficial adoption during that period. Far less common spelling variations include Patxo and Pantxi, while Pacho is used in Latin America – although there Pancho is much more widespread, as is Paco in Castilian-speaking parts of Spain.

Notable people with the name or nickname include:

Francisco Churruca, pelotari
Francisco Gabica, cyclist
Francisco Gamborena, footballer
, architect
José María Pagoaga, handball player
Pantxi Sirieix, footballer
, academic
Patxi Andión, musician and actor
, actor
, pelotari
Patxi Ferreira, footballer
, actor
, musician
, academic
, footballer
, footballer
, footballer
, politician
, businessman and football club president
Patxi Lazcoz, politician
Patxi López, politician (served as Lehendakari and briefly as President of the Congress of Deputies)
Patxi Puñal, footballer
Patxi Rípodas, footballer
Patxi Ruiz, pelotari
, academic
Patxi Salinas, footballer
Patxi Usobiaga, rock climber
Patxi Vila, cyclist
, politician and writer
Patxi Zubizarreta, writer

See also
Patxi's Chicago Pizza, American pizzeria chain

References

Lists of people by nickname
Basque masculine given names